Onnu Chirikku is a 1983 Indian Malayalam-language film, directed by  P. G. Viswambharan. The film stars Mammootty, Swapna, Adoor Bhasi, Raj Kumar and Jalaja in the lead roles. The film has musical score by Johnson.

Cast
Mammootty as Unnikrishnan
Swapna as Rohini Menon
Adoor Bhasi as Krishnan Nair
Raj Kumar as Raju
Jalaja as Urmila Menon
K. P. Ummer as Govindankutty
Sukumari as Radha
Sankaradi as Ananthapadmanabhan Iyer
Nedumudi Venu as Dr. George
Santhakumari as Rohini's mother
Vadivukkarasi as Rohini's elder sister
Kundara Johnny

Soundtrack
The music was composed by Johnson with lyrics by Poovachal Khader.

References

External links
 

1983 films
1980s Malayalam-language films
Films directed by P. G. Viswambharan